The SER 235 class was a class of 0-4-4T steam locomotives on the South Eastern Railway. Introduced in 1866, they were the first locomotives of this wheel arrangement to be built for an English railway.

History
Until 1864 the South Eastern Railway had very few tank locomotives. In that year the 205 class 0-4-2T locomotives were introduced, for use on the London suburban passenger services; they were designed by James I. Cudworth, the company's locomotive superintendent. They performed well, but their capabilities were restricted by the small fuel and water capacities; so after twelve of these were in service, Cudworth produced an enlarged version of the design. There were compensating levers to equalise the weight between the coupled axles, and the outside-framed bogie also had compensating levers; it carried about a third of the locomotive's weight. Like the 205 class, they burned coke as a fuel.

Only one batch (of seven) was built, in 1866; there were troubles with the bogie, and so when more were required, Cudworth once more used the 0-4-2T type, producing the 73 class. However, the 235 class continued to be used, and all were given new boilers between 1877 and 1883. Under Stirling's locomotive classification scheme (September 1879), they formed Class J. They were withdrawn between 1887 and 1893.

Notes

References

235
0-4-4T locomotives
Railway locomotives introduced in 1866
Scrapped locomotives